Jean-Louis Faure was a French sculptor, painter and writer born in 1931 in Paris.
His work as a sculptor which he began in 1979, consists of 112 sculptures (which he preferred to call "narrative carpentry handiwork").

Biography 
Jean-Louis Faure was born in 1931. Elementary and secondary education at the Saint-Seurin-de-Prats school, and in several Parisian Lycées as well as at the Collège de Guyenne. What he remembers best about these school years that he himself describes as "sluggish" is his math teacher in middle school prophesying "poor Faure, you will spend your whole life gathering dust behind an old trunk like a forgotten
crust of bread" (sadly an obsolete expression, n.de.t.)

On May 15, 1942, his father François Faure (Paco in the Résistance) who had thrown his lot in with the Général De Gaulle was arrested by the Germans and sent first to Struthof and then to Dachau. He came back in 1945 and was named Compagnon de la Libération.

In 1950 Jean-Louis Faure was admitted to the École des Beaux Arts, an experience he qualifies as "surreptitious" and during which he learned etching.

Military service in Algeria (1952-1954). As a spahi he was assigned to the Governor's Horse Guard, complete with the 1822 issue sabre, and his artistic talents were noticed: he became "peintre de la cavalerie" (official painter to the cavalry) (no doubt the last of the kind). He is discharged in May 1954. The Algerian War starts on the 1st of November. Self-imposed exile in Bolivia (1955-1956) on the Isla del Sol in the middle of Lake Titicaca. First show of paintings in La Paz.
Resident in Argentina until 1959. Arrested and tried on his return to France, he is acquitted by justice de classe

1960-1972
Jean-Louis Faure agreed with the Manifeste des 121 in support of the right to insubordination. He became art director for various French magazines and for major publishers. He contributed to the creation of the pocket-book collection 10/18, and was blessed with the friendship of Alexandre Vialatte. In 1966 he produced issues of the magazine Le Crapouillot (recently taken over by Jean-Jacques Pauvert) devoted to the Funeral Parlour business, LSD and the Swedes. In 1969 he was hired by the Éditions Rencontre. There he worked (although uncredited) on the making of Max Ophuls' and André Harris's Le Chagrin et La Pitié (The Sorrow and the Pity) produced by Charles Henri Favrod.

In 1973 Jean-Louis Faure took up painting again... before giving it up "to the gratification of all" (dixit the artist) after the Capitonnages (Upholsteries) series.

In 1979 he tried his hand at sculpture (Model used by Lord Ismay...) In 1983, the first exhibition of his sculptures takes place rue Berryer. By pure chance, in this very townhouse formerly owned by the Rothschilds, in the very room he is showing in, Paul Doumer President of the Republic was assassinated in 1932, later to be embalmed by Elie Faure, grandfather of Jean-Louis Faure.
In 1987, his appearance in a documentary about contemporary sculpture by the German director Heinz-Peter Schwerfel elicited the following evaluation by Le Figaro newspaper art-critic Michel Nuridsany: "Best ignore the presence of Frenchman Jean-Louis Faure, who was probably chosen to compound the notion, very prevalent in Germany, that French Art ceased to exist twenty years ago."

Since 1979 Jean-Louis Faure had made 112 sculptures which later he preferred to call “ works of narrative carpentry”), as well as designed the Académie des Sciences sword for Professor Alain-Jacques Valleron. 
Jean-Louis Faure died on 22 February 2022 from COVID-19

Works 
From the beginning, (1979), Jean-Louis Faure often incorporated manufactured objects in his pieces(taps, car-mats, plates and cutlery, etc...), distantly reminiscent of Marcel Duchamp's Ready mades.
Later these incorporations would come to include personal belongings (decorations, photographs, weapons...) as well as art-works, some inherited from his grand-father Elie Faure (African masks, anonymous XIV century statue of the Virgin, portfolio of Goya's etchings, unfinished oil on board painting by Chaïm Soutine, Hellenistic sculpture from the II century BC, etc...).
In 2004 Régis Debray- who has come to know the oeuvre over the years- plans the building of a wooden structure in his vast garden in order to exhibit it. For material reasons the project comes to nothing.
In 2009 : Exhibitions and (temporary) consigment of all most all the sculptures in the Dominique Vivant Denon and Nicéphore Niepce Museums in Châlon-sur-Saône.
In 2013, Régis Debray's unflagging support of Jean-Louis Faure in word and act, inspires Antoine Gallimard with the notion of exhibiting the work Bêtise de l'Intelligence for a year in the entrance hall of the NRF (today Éditions Gallimard)
Since 1979 Jean-Louis Faure has made 112 sculptures  (which today he prefers to call "works of narrative carpentry"), as well as designed the Académie des Sciences sword for Professor Alain-Jacques Valleron (2005)
According to Bertrand Raison, « In order to approach Jean-Louis Faure's univers sculpté (you must) read the titles of his works, but furthermore (...) closely parse the small notes he painstakingly composes for each piece. The sculpture and its caption go hand in hand". For Patrick Marnham "Much of Faure's work grows out of his fascination with the darker sides of French history and the farcical undercurrents of power. The titles give the flavour of his preoccupations."

Project for a Public Monument

In 2006, for a commission by the Ville de Paris, Jean-Louis Faure submitted a project for a sculpture in honour of General Dumas which would have been erected in Géneral-Catroux square on a grassy embankment bordered by Avenue de Villiers, fifty metres from Gustave Doré's tribute to Alexandre Dumas, the general's son. The Direction des Affaires Culturelles de la Ville de Paris did not follow up on this proposition.

Conservation

Exhibitions 

Personal shows (a selection)

Group shows (a selection)

Writings

Further reading 
Books
 

Articles in English

Filmography

Notes and references

External links 
 
 Sources in the fine arts field:Faure, Jean-Louis (1931)

1931 births
2022 deaths
20th-century French sculptors
21st-century French sculptors
20th-century French male artists
21st-century French male artists
20th-century French painters
21st-century French painters
Painters from Paris
French Army soldiers